Manjeri is a major town and municipality in Malappuram district, Kerala, India. It is the fourth-most populous municipality in state. It is one of the major commercial towns under the Malappuram urban agglomeration and serves as the headquarters of Eranad Taluk. Manjeri Municipality is a Local Self Government Institution with a jurisdiction of three villages namely Manjeri, Payyanad, and Narukara.

History
The remains of pre-historic symbols including Dolmens, Menhirs, and Rock-cut caves that have been found from various parts of Manjeri indicates human life at the region in the Stone Age itself. The region was under the control of Zamorins in medieval period. There was a set pattern of succession, indicated by Sthanams (ranks) in the royal line in the Kingdom of Zamorins. Five Sthanams were defined in the kingdom of Zamorin, each with its own separate property enjoyed in succession by the senior members of the three Kovilakams (palaces) of the family
. One of these five Sthanams came to be known as Edattaranadu Nambiyathiri Thirumulpadu (the Etatralpadu), which is mentioned in the Manjeri Pulapatta inscription as the overlord of the "Three Hundred" Nairs. The Etatralpadu used to reside in a palace at Edathara near Manjeri. Manjeri Kovilakam was one of the seats of the ruling families of the Zamorins of Calicut.

Manjeri was once the headquarters and the military centre of the Kingdom of Mysore under Tipu Sultan. Under British rule, Manjeri served as the administrative headquarters of Eranad subdistrict, which was the largest subdistrict within the Malabar District. In 1896, the landlords of Manjeri Kovilakam started to evacuate the tenants from their lands. The landless tenants started to revolt under the leadership of Variyan Kunnathu Kunjahammed Haji. They seized the land and properties of the landlords. British army came to help the landlords. The conflict caused the British to risk 94 out of 100 soldiers.

The Malabar district political conference of Indian National Congress held at Manjeri on 28 April 1920, fueled Indian independence movement and national movement in British Malabar. That conference declared that the Montagu–Chelmsford Reforms were not able to satisfy the needs of British India. It also argued for a land reform to seek solutions for the problems caused by tenancy that existed in Malabar.  However, the decision widened the drift between extremists and moderates within the Congress. The conference resulted in dissatisfaction of landlords with the Indian National Congress. It caused the leadership of the Malabar district Congress Committee to come under the control of the extremists who stood for labourers and the middle class.

The region has been part of movements such as Khilafat Movement and Malabar rebellion following the Manjeri conference. It was one of the strongholds of the Malabar Rebellion in 1921. Manjeri police station was destructed by the rebels on 21 August 1921. The protestors won in removing the colonial rule from the region and establish self-rule for about six months. After Indian independence in 1947, the region continued in Malabar District. In 1969, it became a part of the newly formed Malappuram district. Now it forms a part of the Malappuram metropolitan area.

Demographics
Total population under municipality limits is 97,102 according to the 2011 census. Males form 48.6% and females 51.4%. Malayalam is the widely spoken language in the town. Manjeri has been a multi-ethnic and multi-religious town since the early medieval period. The Muslims form the largest religious group, followed by Hindus and Christians. The municipality of Manjeri has an average literacy rate of 95.8%.

Geography 

It has an average elevation of 38 metres (124 feet) from sea level.

Civic administration 

The town is administered by the Manjeri Municipality, headed by a chairperson. For administrative purposes, the town is divided into 50 wards, from which the members of the municipal council are elected for five years. The municipality comes under the jurisdiction of Manjeri police station (formerly known as Eranad Police Station at the time of its formation), which was formed on 14 April 1879. The apex district court of Malappuram district is at Manjeri and the judicial district is known as Manjeri judicial district.
{ "type": "ExternalData",  "service": "geoshape",  "ids": "Q16134188"}

Manjeri Municipality Election 2020

Wards

Manjeri Municipality is composed of the following 50 wards:

Important Institutions

Government
Courts in Manjeri
 Manjeri Judicial District
 District Court, Manjeri
 Assistant Sessions Court, Manjeri
 Fast Track I, Manjeri
 Fast Track II, Manjeri
 Fast Track III, Manjeri
 SC/ST Special Court, Manjeri
 MACT Court, Manjeri
 CJM Court, Manjeri
 Judicial First Class Magistrate Court I Manjeri
 Judicial First Class Magistrate Court II (Forest) Manjeri
 Municiff Court Manjeri
Other Government Institutions within Manjeri

 Municipal Office Manjeri
 Government Medical College, Manjeri
 Eranad Taluk Office,  Manjeri
 AIR Manjeri FM Radio Station
 Manjeri Postal Division
 Head Post Office Manjeri
 Excise Range Office, Manjeri
 Excise Office, Manjeri
 KSEB North & South Offices, Manjeri
 Fire & Rescue Unit, Manjeri
 BEVCO outlet, Manjeri
 Telephone Exchange, Manjeri
 KSRTC Station master office, Manjeri
 PWD Office, Manjeri
 Sub Jail Manjeri
 Sales Tax office, Manjeri
 Taluk Civil Supply office, Manjeri
 Sub Registrar officer, Manjeri
 Sub Treasury office, Manjeri
 Stamp Dipott Manjeri
 Guest House, Manjeri
 Water Authority, Anakkayam
 Manjeri Circle office
 Traffic Unit Manjeri
 Cashew nut Research Centre, Anakkayam

Education

Important Educational Institutions within Manjeri
 N.S.S College, Manjeri
 Eranad Knowledge City, Manjeri
 Eranad Knowledge City College of Engineering, Manjeri
 Government Medical College, Manjeri
 Cooperative Arts & Science College Manjeri
 Korambayil Ahammed Haji Memorial Unity Women's College, Manjeri
 Govt. Poly Technic Manjeri
 Government Boys HSS Manjeri
 Govt Girls HSS Manjeri
 HMYHSS Manjeri
 Govt Higher Secondary School Irumbuzhi Manjeri
 Vocational Higher Secondary School Nellikkuth Manjeri
 Vocational Higher secondary school Pullanoor
 Govt High School Elankoor
 Amritha Vidya Peedam Manjeri
 NSS English Medium School Manjeri
 Govt. LPS Manjeri
 Govt.UP School Manjeri
 Ace Public School Manjeri
 Noble Public School Manjeri
 Chinmaya public School
 Mubarack English Medium School
 Nazareth English medium School
 AMUPS Vadakangara
 Alfalah Public School
 MIC Valluvambram
 Blossom Public School
 Manavedan UPS Thrikkalangode
 Jamia Islamia Higher Secondary school
 Shanmugha vilasam School Karikkad
 ICS public School Manjeri
 Charangavu PMS School Elankur
 AMUPS Mullambara
 Valluvambram UPS
 Khadheeja English Medium Pappinippara
 AUPS Pappinippara
 Al Huda English Medium Pappinippara
 Rahmath Public medium school
 AUPS Thottappara
 AMLPS Karaparamba
 CHM Highschool Pookolathoor
 GLPS School Manjeri Vayapparappadi
 Good Hope School Mangalassery

Healthcare

Important Healthcare Institutions within Manjeri
 Government Medical College, Manjeri
 Government General Hospital, Manjeri
 Government TB Hospital, Manjeri
 Eranad Hospital Manjeri
 Prasanthi Hi tech Hospital, Manjeri
 Malabar Hospital Manjeri
 KMH Hospital Manjeri
 Manu Memmorial Hospital Manjeri
 Mana sneha Hospital,Muttipalam, Manjeri
 Ayurvedic Hospital Mullambara Manjeri
 Govt Primary Health Centre Mangalassery
 Govt Primary Health Centre Thrippanachi
 Veterinary hospital Manjeri
 Veterinary hospital Pookolathoor

Finance

Important Financial Institutions within Manjeri
 Union Bank Of India Manjeri
 KSFE, Manjeri
 Thrikkalangode Service Co-operative Bank
 Pulpatta Service Co-operative Bank
 Service Co-operative Bank Mailuth
 Elankur Service Co-operative Bank, Pelepuram
 Payyanad Co-operative Service Bank
 Ernad Co-operative Bank, Nilambur Road, Manjeri
 Anakkayam Service Co-operative Bank
 Axis Bank, Manjeri
 Bank of Baroda, Manjeri
 Bank of India, Manjeri
 Canara Bank, Manjeri 
 Catholic Syrian Bank, Manjeri
 Manjeri Co-operative Bank
 District Co-Operative Bank, Manjeri
 Federal Bank, Manjeri
 HDFC Bank, Manjeri
 ICICI Bank, Manjeri
 Indian Bank, Manjeri
 Indian Overseas Bank, Manjeri
 Yes Bank, Manjeri
 Punjab National Bank, Manjeri
 South Indian Bank, Manjeri
 Kerala Gramin Bank, Manjeri
 State Bank of India Manjeri
 Syndicate Bank, Manjeri
 UAE Exchange Bank, Manjeri
 Cholamandalam Finance, Manjeri
 Sreeram Investments Manjeri
 Sundram Finance Manjeri
 Sree Gokulam Chitts & Finance Manjeri
 Manapuram General Finance Leesing Limited, Manjeri
 Sree Lakshmi Bankers, Manjeri
VIBGYOR NIDHI LIMITED MANJERI 9625111444

Sports

The Malappuram District Sports Complex & Football Academy is situated at Payyanad, Manjeri.  MDSC Stadium was selected as one of two stadiums, along with the Jawaharlal Nehru Stadium, to host the group stages of the 2013–14 Indian Federation Cup. The stadium hosted groups B and D.

Notable people
 Ali Musliyar - Freedom activist.
 Arjun Jayaraj - Footballer.
 Jishnu Balakrishnan - Footballer.
 Variyan Kunnathu Kunjahammed Haji - Indian Freedom Fighter.
 M. P. M. Ahammed Kurikkal - Former minister of Kerala.
 K. T. Muhammed - Malayalam playwright and screenwriter.
 Ishaq Kurikkal - Politician.
 T. K. Hamza - Former minister of Kerala.
 U. A. Latheef - Politician, Lawyer.
 Shanavas Shanu - Actor.
 Anikha - Actress.
 Dhanish Karthik - Actor.
 M.P. Jabir - Athlete

See also
 Government Medical College, Manjeri
 Manjeri stadium 
 AIR Manjeri FM
 N.S.S College, Manjeri
 Korambayil Ahammed Haji Memorial Unity Women's College, Manjeri
 District Hospital, Manjeri
 Manjeri (State Assembly constituency)
 Malappuram (Lok Sabha constituency)
 Anakkayam
 Malappuram
 Eranad Taluk
 Eranad

References

External links

Cities and towns in Malappuram district